Epner is a surname. Notable people with the surname include:

Eero Epner (born 1978), Estonian art historian and playwright
Johan Epner (1893–?), Estonian politician

See also
Epper (surname)